Life after death is the survival of the essence of an individual once life has ended.

Life after death may also refer to:
 Life After Death (Natas album), a 1992 hip hop album
 Life After Death, a 1997 hip hop album by The Notorious B.I.G.
 Dead Like Me: Life After Death, a 2009 American film
 Life After Death (The Creepshow album), a 2013 psychobilly album
 Life After Death (TV series), a 2020 Hong Kong television series
 Life After Death (TobyMac album), a 2022 album by TobyMac

See also
After death (disambiguation)
Afterlife (disambiguation)
Live After Death, an album by Iron Maiden
"Life After Death and Taxes (Failure II)", a song by Relient K
Life After Death Row, a documentary 
Life After Def, an album by Montell Jordan
Life After Life (disambiguation)
My Life After Death
Resurrection of the dead
World to come
"On Life After Death", a song by the American band Bright from the album The Albatross Guest House